The Gurkha Reserve Unit (GRU) (Malay: Unit Simpanan Gurkha / Pasukan Simpanan Gurkha (PSG) ) is a Nepalese special elite guard force in the Sultanate of Brunei. It was formed in 1974 and maintains approximately 2,000 Gurkhas.

Unit members are all British Army veterans who function primarily as a royal guard to protect the sultan, the Royal Family, and major oil installations. They also work as a special forces unit directly under the command of the Sultan, as well as alongside the Special Forces Regiment and Special Combat Squadron of the Royal Brunei Armed Forces.

It is subordinate to the Security and Defence Section of the Brunei Ministry of Home Affairs.

History

In 1947, the Britain–India–Nepal Tripartite Agreement was signed between India, United Kingdom and Nepal, except that this agreement does not apply to Gurkhas employed in the Nepalese Army. Under the agreement, four Gurkha regiments of British Army were transferred to British Army and six joined the Indian army. As of 2020, India has 39 Gorkha battalions serving in seven Gorkha regiments. Those transferred to the British Army were posted to other remaining British colonies. In Malaya and Singapore, their presence was required in the Malayan Emergency, and they were to replace the Sikh unit in Singapore which reverted to the Indian Army on Indian independence.

In 1973, prisoners of the 1962 uprising escaped. the Sultanate of Brunei decided to hire ex-Gurkhas from Hong Kong and Singapore as security after Singapore was consulted. On February 25, 1974, Mohansing Gurung became the first Gurkha to serve in Brunei.

The unit was known as the Gurkha Security Guard. The GRU was fully established in 1980.

Units
 Guard Unit (GD UNIT)
 Support Unit (SP UNIT)
 K-9 Unit (K-9 UNIT)

See also
 Military of Brunei
 Gurkha Rifles of the British Indian Army (1858–1947)
 Gorkha regiments (India), seven regiments in India which is the original parent force for the units in Singapore and Brunei
 Gurkha Contingent (Singapore)
 Gurkha Regiment (United Kingdom)
 Brigade of Gurkhas (British Army)
 Royal Gurkha Rifles (British Army)

References

External links
Serving abroad — at Photius.com
RBAF Order of Battle
Brigade of Gurkhas — British Army website

Law enforcement agencies of Brunei
Military of Brunei
Gurkhas